Ernest William Tuckett (1914 – 27 May 1945) was an English professional footballer who played as an inside forward.

Career
Born in Marske, Tuckett spent his early career with Redcar Westfield, Guisborough Brigantes, Scarborough, Arsenal and Margate. He joined Arsenal as an 18-year-old amateur in June 1932, turning professional in March 1936 after a spell with nursery club Margate in 1934.

He joined Bradford City from Arsenal in February 1937, in exchange for Laurie Scott. He made 13 league and 1 FA Cup appearances for the club, before moving to Fulham in April 1938. He returned to Bradford City during World War Two, briefly guesting for Redcar Albion near his hometown of Marske on Christmas Day in 1940, before dying in an airfield accident on 27 May 1945 when serving as a corporal in the Royal Air Force.

Sources

References

1914 births
1945 deaths
Royal Air Force Volunteer Reserve personnel of World War II
Royal Air Force personnel killed in World War II
English footballers
Scarborough F.C. players
Arsenal F.C. players
Margate F.C. players
Bradford City A.F.C. players
Fulham F.C. players
Bradford City A.F.C. wartime guest players
English Football League players
Association football inside forwards
Royal Air Force airmen
Military personnel from Yorkshire